The 2021–22 CSA Steaua București season is the team's 60th season since its founding in 1947.

Players

First team squad

Transfers

In

Source:

Out

Source:

Pre-season and friendlies

Competitions

Overview

Liga II

Standings

Results by round

Matches

Play-off matches

Cupa României

Statistics

Squad appearances and goals
Last updated on 31 March 2022.

|-
! colspan="12" style="background:#dcdcdc; text-align:center"|Goalkeepers

|-
! colspan="12" style="background:#dcdcdc; text-align:center"|Defenders

|-
! colspan="12" style="background:#dcdcdc; text-align:center"|Midfielders

|-
! colspan="12" style="background:#dcdcdc; text-align:center"|Forwards

|}

References

External links

CSA Steaua București seasons
Steaua